Richard Garfield Flash (born 8 April 1976) is an English former footballer. He made eleven appearances in the Football League for Watford, Lincoln City and Plymouth Argyle, before retiring due to injury in 1999.

Early life
Flash was born in Birmingham. As a schoolboy he was scouted by Liverpool, Arsenal, Aston Villa and Manchester United; Manchester United scout Geoff Watson persuaded him to sign schoolboy forms, and he went on to captain United's West Midland youth team, the Manchester Eagles, for three years, winning the Keele Classic at under-14 level. In 1990, he turned down the opportunity to move to the F.A's National School of Excellence at Lilleshall to train locally with Aston Villa and Birmingham City, in addition to Manchester United. However, an injury to his right knee at age 14 hampered his development.

Youth career
In 1992, he joined the ranks at Manchester United with Michael Appleton, Terry Cooke, David Johnson and Jovan Kirovski. During his seven-year club career, he played at youth team and reserve level. However, another knee injury sustained early in his Manchester United career, this time a dislocated right patella, forced him onto the sidelines for two years.

Senior career
In 1995 Flash was signed by Graham Taylor and moved to reserve team level at Wolverhampton Wanderers. Graham Taylor re-signed him at Watford, where he made his senior debut as a substitute on 3 May 1997, but this was his only appearance for the club. After a brief spell on loan at Lincoln City he was injured again and sidelined for 6 months. Graham Taylor released him in 1998 but recommended him to Kevin Hodges at Plymouth Argyle, where he suffered a career-ending dislocation of his left patella in the 1998–99 season.

Personal life
Flash has a master's degree and has been manager of a branch of Goals Soccer Centres, a five-a-side football company;  he is head of the academic department at UCFB.

References

External links

1976 births
Living people
Footballers from Birmingham, West Midlands
English footballers
Association football midfielders
English Football League players
Aston Villa F.C. players
Manchester United F.C. players
Wolverhampton Wanderers F.C. players
Watford F.C. players
Lincoln City F.C. players
Plymouth Argyle F.C. players
English people of Jamaican descent